Festal is a brand name drug containing pancreatin, hemicellulase, and certain bile components. It is indicated for use in people with gastrointestinal problems in order to help actively digest food (especially fatty meals that require pancreatic enzymes).

References

Links 
 

Drugs acting on the gastrointestinal system and metabolism
Combination drugs